Setaimata Sa (born 14 September 1987) is a professional rugby league footballer who plays for the Mackay Cutters in the Intrust Super Cup.

Background
Sa was born in Samoa.
His junior club was Shirley before he was poached by the Papanui Tigers as a 9 year old in the Canterbury Rugby League competition.

Rugby league career
Sa made his first grade debut for the Sydney Roosters against St. George Illawarra in round 7 of the 2006 NRL season. In his final year at the club during the 2009 NRL season, he made 20 appearances as the Sydney Roosters finished last for the first time since 1966 and claimed the Wooden Spoon. 
On 30 August 2009, Setaimata Sa was charged with assault, resisting arrest, malicious damage and failure to leave a licensed premises, after a drunken episode in a Sydney hotel.
He played for the Catalans Dragons in 2010 after sealing a release from the final two years of his Sydney Roosters contract. The deal was a part exchange transfer involving Jason Ryles moving in the opposite direction.

In 2014 Sa transferred to Hull F.C. on a contract until the end of 2015.
On 25 October 2016, Sa signed a three-year contract with Australian Rugby League team Mackay Cutters who play in the Intrust Super Cup.

International career
He was called up for the 2008 ANZAC day test at the SCG.
In August 2008, Sa was named in the New Zealand training squad for the 2008 Rugby League World Cup, and in October 2008, he was named in the final 24-man Kiwi squad.

He also represented Samoa on five occasions scoring four tries. In 2006 he was selected for the New Zealand Tri-Nations squad but was not selected for any of the matches in the series. In 2007 he was in running to be selected for New Zealand again but missed out through injury along with Kiwi international and Sydney Roosters teammate Iosia Soliola. Sa was a member of the World Cup winning New Zealand team beating Australia in the 2008 World Cup Final at Suncorp Stadium, Brisbane. Sa was eligible to represent Samoa.

Rugby union career
When at Shirley Boys' High School in Christchurch he played Rugby for the school's first XV.

In 2012 Sa signed a contract to switch codes and play rugby union for the London Irish club, which was finally completed in January 2013 after he received a work permit.

On 9 November 2012, he made his debut for the Samoan national team against Canada.

References

External links
 Profile at sydneyroosters.com.au

1987 births
Catalans Dragons players
Expatriate rugby league players in Australia
Expatriate rugby league players in France
Expatriate rugby union players in England
Hull F.C. players
Living people
London Irish players
Mackay Cutters players
New Zealand expatriate rugby league players
New Zealand expatriate rugby union players
New Zealand expatriate sportspeople in England
New Zealand expatriate sportspeople in France
New Zealand national rugby league team players
Papanui Tigers players
People educated at Shirley Boys' High School
Rugby league centres
Rugby league five-eighths
Samoa international rugby union players
Samoa national rugby league team players
Samoan emigrants to New Zealand
Samoan expatriate rugby league players
Samoan expatriate rugby union players
Samoan expatriate sportspeople in France
Samoan expatriate sportspeople in England
Samoan rugby league players
Samoan rugby union players
Sydney Roosters players
Widnes Vikings players